Leave It to Me is a  1997 novel by Bharati Mukherjee.  It utilizes the myth of the Hindu mother Goddess, Durga.

Publication history
 Hardcover — , published in June 1997 by Alfred A. Knopf.
 Paperback — , published in November 1998 by Random House

External links
Bharati Mukherjee:Outsider Looking In, Insider Looking Beyond

Reviews
Melus
Powells review
Ballantine's Reader's Circle
Reading Group Guide
Asiaweek.com review

1997 American novels
Novels by Bharati Mukherjee
Alfred A. Knopf books
Novels set in New York (state)
Novels set in San Francisco